Carlos Cisneros (born 24 November 1933) is an Argentine former basketball player.

References

1933 births
Living people
Argentine men's basketball players
Basketball players at the 1955 Pan American Games
Pan American Games medalists in basketball
Pan American Games silver medalists for Argentina
Medalists at the 1955 Pan American Games